was a Japanese football player and manager. He played for Japan national team.

Club career
Uchino was born in Kanagawa Prefecture on April 21, 1934. After graduating from Chuo University, he joined Furukawa Electric. He won 1960, 1961 and 1964 Emperor's Cup. In 1965, Furukawa Electric joined new league Japan Soccer League. He played 47 games and scored 19 goals in the league. He retired in 1969.

National team career
On January 2, 1955, when Uchino was a Chuo University student, he debuted for Japan national team against Burma. In June 1956, at 1956 Summer Olympics qualification against South Korea, he scored an important first goal. After the qualification, Japan won the qualification to 1956 Summer Olympics in Melbourne by the drawing of lots. In November, he was selected Japan for 1956 Olympics. He also played at 1958 and 1962 Asian Games. He played 18 games and scored 3 goals for Japan until 1962.

Coaching career
In 1966, when Uchino played for Furukawa Electric, he became a playing manager as Ryuzo Hiraki successor and managed the club in 1 season. In 1979, he became a manager for the club as Mitsuo Kamata successor again. The club won 1982 JSL Cup. End of 1983 season, he resigned.

Club statistics

National team statistics

References

External links
 
 Japan National Football Team Database

1934 births
2013 deaths
Chuo University alumni
Association football people from Kanagawa Prefecture
Japanese footballers
Japan international footballers
Japan Soccer League players
JEF United Chiba players
Olympic footballers of Japan
Footballers at the 1956 Summer Olympics
Footballers at the 1958 Asian Games
Footballers at the 1962 Asian Games
Japanese football managers
Player-coaches
Association football forwards
Asian Games competitors for Japan